From the Double Gone Chapel is a studio album by Two Lone Swordsmen. It was released through Warp on 17 May 2004. The album's title derives from a pub in East End of London. The album includes a cover of the Gun Club's "Sex Beat". The album peaked at number 19 on the UK Independent Albums Chart.

Critical reception

At Metacritic, which assigns a weighted average score out of 100 to reviews from mainstream critics, the album received an average score of 69, based on 13 reviews, indicating "generally favorable reviews".

Heather Phares of AllMusic gave the album 3 out of 5 stars, writing, "Even if the sound they pursue here is just a detour, its seamless and creative fusion of rock and electronic idioms deserves respect." Dan Lett of Pitchfork gave the album a 7.9 out of 10, commenting that "The contrasting styles don't always sit comfortably, but individual tracks sparkle with creativity and the newfound dark side is a surprisingly pleasant fit." Dorian Lynskey of The Guardian gave the album 4 out of 5 stars and called it "the duo's most arresting album yet, introducing live instruments, songwriting and Weatherall's own deadpan vocals to their murky electronic brew."

In 2014, NME placed it at number 64 on the "101 Albums to Hear Before You Die" list.

Track listing

Personnel
Credits adapted from liner notes.

 Andrew Weatherall – production, mixing
 Keith Tenniswood – production, mixing
 Lung – additional guitar (1), artwork
 Richard Thair – drums (1, 11)
 Nick Burton – guest appearance (3, 4, 5, 7, 12)
 Gordon Mills – guest appearance (6)
 Wildcat Will – guest appearance (9)
 Nina Walsh – vocals (11)
 Moonus – keyboards (12)
 Noel Summerville – mastering

Charts

References

External links
 

2004 albums
Two Lone Swordsmen albums
Warp (record label) albums
Albums produced by Andrew Weatherall